Neophyllaphis podocarpi, the podocarpus aphid, is a species of aphid in the family Aphididae.

References

Neophyllaphidinae
Articles created by Qbugbot
Insects described in 1920